JoAnn Slama Lighty is an American chemical engineer who is a professor at Boise State University. Her research considers carbon capture, chemical looping and black carbon emissions. In 2020 she was elected a Fellow of the American Association for the Advancement of Science for her air quality research.

Education 
Lighty was an undergraduate student at the University of Utah, where she specialized in chemical engineering. She remained there for her doctoral research, studying opportunities to cleanup contaminated waste using thermal treatment.

Research and career 
Lighty studies the combustion and gasifaction of fuels, and how these processes result in the formation of airborne pollutants. She has worked on carbon-capture from coal powered combustion systems and soot oxidation in fuel-lean conditions.

Lighty joined the faculty at the University of Utah in 1988. In 2007, Lighty was elected Chair of Chemical Engineering at the University. She spent 2010 as a Fellow at Churchill College, Cambridge. Her scientific research involves policy work with the United States Environmental Protection Agency and National Science Foundation.

Lighty worked as Division Director for Chemical, Bioengineering, Environmental, and Transport Systems at the National Science Foundation. In this capacity, she oversaw the clean water program, which sought to identify low cost, low energy technologies to test and treat water. In 2017 Lighty joined Boise State University as Dean  of Engineering.

Academic service 
At the University of Utah, Lighty founded the High School Girls Engineering Abilities Realized (HiGEAR) outreach programme and the elementary engineering group.

Awards and honors 
 Society of Women Engineers Distinguished Engineering Educator Award
 Utah Engineering Educator of the Year
 YWCA Outstanding Achievement Award
 University of Utah Linda Amos Award for Distinguished Service to Women
 Fellow of the American Institute of Chemical Engineers
 Fellow of the American Association for the Advancement of Science
 American Institute of Chemical Engineers Lawrence K. Cecil Award

Selected publications

Personal life 
Lighty is married with two daughters.

References 

Living people
Year of birth missing (living people)
American chemical engineers
University of Utah alumni
Boise State University faculty
American women scientists
American women academics
21st-century American women